MUX, Mux, or mux may refer to:
 MUX, an abbreviation for multiplexer in circuit design
 Mux, another name for Multiplex (television)
 MUX, IATA code for Multan International Airport, Pakistan
 mux (windowing system), the windowing system for the Blit computer terminal 
 MUX clamp, a tool used in deep sea drilling operations
 Multi-User eXperience, a computer gaming term (see: MU*)
 Marginal rate of substitution variable for the Marginal Utility of good x (MUx)
 Mux Mool, American electronic musician, DJ, and producer
 Isuzu MU-X, a SUV by Japanese Automobile Isuzu

See also
 Muxe, Zapotec transgender term